Essex Police is a territorial police force responsible for policing the county of Essex, in the East of England.

The chief constable is Ben-Julian Harrington, who took up the appointment in October 2018.

Essex and Kent Police share support services, such as administration, fleet and a Serious Crime Directorate (SCD). It's currently led by Assistant Chief Constable Andy Pritchard who works across both force areas. The collaboration between them began in 2007.

Essex Police are overseen by the elected Essex Police, Fire and Crime Commissioner, Roger Hirst.

History
Essex Constabulary was formed in 1840. In 1965, the force had an establishment of 1,862 officers.

Southend-on-Sea Borough Police was established by the county borough of Southend-on-Sea, England, in 1914. In 1969, Southend-on-Sea Borough Police amalgamated with Essex Constabulary to become the Essex and Southend-on-Sea Joint Constabulary. This merger was campaigned against by the council and the local MPs.
Colchester also at one time had its own police force.

The title was shortened to Essex Police in 1974. In April 2000, it took over parts of the county in the south-west (Loughton, Waltham Abbey, Chigwell and Buckhurst Hill) formerly in the Metropolitan Police Area.

Epping Forest Keepers act as Epping Forest constables in the Forest parishes in the south-west of the Essex Police area; they have different powers from those of the Essex Police.

Chief constables
Chief constables of Essex have been:
Essex Constabulary (1840)
 1840–1881 : John Bunch Bonnemaison McHardy
 1881–1887 : William Henry Poyntz
 1888–1915 : Edward McLean Showers
 1915–1932 : John Alfred Unett
 1933–1962 : (Sir) Francis Jonathan Peel
 1962–1978 : Sir John Cyprian Nightingale (knighted in 1975 New Year Honours)
Essex Police (1974)
 1978–1987 : (Sir) Robert Sidney Bunyard
 1988–1998 : John Halcrow Burrow
 1998–2005 : David Frederick Stevens
 2005–2009 : Roger Baker
 2009–2013 : Jim Barker-McCardle
 2013–2018 : Stephen Kavanagh
 2018–present : Ben-Julian Harrington

Officers killed in the line of duty

The Police Roll of Honour Trust and Police Memorial Trust list and commemorate all British police officers killed in the line of duty. Since its establishment in 1984, the Police Memorial Trust has erected 50 memorials nationally to some of those officers.

Since 1849, the following officers of Essex Police were killed while attempting to prevent or stop a crime in progress:
Constable Ian Dibell, 2012
Constable Gary John Veal, 2002
Constable Roderick Norton Daniels, 2001
Constable Christopher John Wiggins, 1992
Acting Sergeant Brian John Bishop, 1984
Constable Peter James Wringe, 1982
Constable Brian Arthur Rippingale, 1968
Sergeant Edmund Sleigh Frost, 1948
Constable George William Gutteridge, 1927
Constable Joseph Watt, 1913
Acting Sergeant Adam John Eves, 1893
Inspector Thomas Simmons, 1885
Constable Robert Bamborough, 1850
Head Constable William Campling, 1849

Organisation

Essex Police is one of the United Kingdom's largest non-metropolitan police forces with a strength of over 4000 sworn police officers.

Its headquarters, the Force Control Room (FCR) (where emergency calls are routed to) and Essex Police College, are both located in Chelmsford.

Strategically, Essex is an important force. Bordering London, the force area consists of affluent city suburbs, large urban areas, industrial centres, rural villages, London Stansted Airport (one of the busiest international airports in the country) and two of the UK's major ports (Harwich and Tilbury). The force also polices one of the largest expanses of coastline of any force in the UK.

The Chief Constable is Ben-Julian Harrington who replaced Stephen Kavanagh after he retired in October 2018.

The force has been a regular innovator and is often used by the Home Office to trial new procedures and equipment, including automatic number plate recognition (ANPR), Lantern (handheld wireless fingerprint verification) and the X26 Taser.

Essex Police was also the subject of the television series Police Interceptors, which followed the work of the specialist Mobile Support Division's ANPR intercept unit that utilise high-performance pursuit vehicles, including the Mitsubishi Evo X and Subaru Impreza, to pursue and intercept mobile criminals. In late 2016, Essex Police was also the subject of a television series The Force: Essex, which followed the duties and responsibilities of Essex Police in the modern day, covering the front-line aspect of the police officers on duty, across Essex.

Previously a number of specialist teams within Essex were grouped into the Mobile Support Division. In 2012 Essex Police moved away from the divisional structure to a patrol based structure and the former components of the Mobile Support Division were moved to new command structures. Roads Policing and Dog Section became part of the Response and Patrol function.

Crime Division

Crime Division works across the territorial divisions of Essex and with forces nationwide, providing resources and expertise.

As a division within Essex Police, it deals with the specialist aspects of crime investigation, tending to focus on serious crime, but not exclusively and provides support to territorial divisions' efforts in investigating crime.

Crime Division has a command team structure of a divisional commander, supported by a director of intelligence, lead senior investigating officer, support manager and divisional administrative manager, based at the Chelmsford headquarters. This team is supported by section heads. The work of the various departments of Crime Division are both proactive and reactive.

Major Investigation Team
The way in which major crimes are investigated has changed over time. 30 years ago, the head of Crime Division would have carried out every part of the investigation in a murder case himself, including interviewing key witnesses. However, this has now been transformed with the advent of computerised Major Investigation Rooms and concerns over handling complex, high-profile enquiries like the Stephen Lawrence case.

In April 2000, the Major Investigation Team (MIT) was set up to investigate homicides, abductions, rapes and extortion. Each major investigation has a senior investigation officer (SIO), who is like the conductor of an orchestra, overseeing all the different parts of the investigations. The SIO works with a MIT and they are supported by the resources of Major Investigation Centralised Administrative Support (MICAS).

There are four MIT offices, at Harlow, Brentwood, Stanway and Rayleigh. The scale of enquiry determines the manpower required, the well-publicised case of the murdered schoolgirl Danielle Jones in June 2001 being a good example of the four offices 'pooling' resources and working as one team.

Operational Support Group (OSG)

The OSG are members of Essex Police trained to deal with riots, drugs raids, other public order incidents, escorting suspects to be extradited to other countries, CRBN, and evacuation in the event of CRBN attack. They are the equivalent of the Met's TSG unit. They were involved in President Obama's landing at Stansted in 2016. They helped the Met deal with the 2011 London Riots. They are based at Boreham, outside of Chelmsford.

When not engaged in other specialists duties, OSG officers perform mobile patrols. Most officers are trained in advanced driving, and assist Roads Policing Unit colleagues in pursuits and policing the roads using high performance vehicles. Alternatively, officers may support local officers in policing the night-time economy.

Force Support Unit (FSU)

The FSU provide firearms and tactical assistance, equivalent to the Met's CO19 branch. They respond to firearms callouts, help out with drug raids, as well as taking part in covert operations. They also patrol Stansted Airport, and in September 2016, armed patrols started at Southend Airport and Lakeside shopping centre. The FSU officers are all Authorised Firearms Officers (AFOs) and can go on to be Specialist Firearms Officers (SFOs). They will either be wearing baseball caps on patrol, or the "Fritz" style helmet for tactical duties. The FSU shot Stephen Debley, the first person to be shot by Essex Police for 31 years as of October 2016. They have also been involved in many manhunts, the most well known and recent being the death of PC Dibell, who was shot by 63-year old Peter Reeve in Clacton on Sea.

, the FSU used the following specialist equipment:
 Accuracy International Bolt Action Rifle 
 Tikka T3 Rifle Bolt Action Rifle 
 H&K 417 Semi Auto Rifle 
 H&K G36C Carbine 
 H&K L104A2 Launcher (Baton Gun) 
 SIG Pro Self-loading Pistol 
 SIG P250 Self-loading Pistol 
 Benelli Nova/Super Nova Pump shotgun 
 TASER X2

Roads Policing Unit (RPU)

The RPU operates out of four locations across Essex. Part of OPC, the RPU works to the National Roads Policing Strategy which has five strands; casualty reduction, counter terrorism, anti-social use of the roads, disrupting criminality and high visibility patrols of the road network. RPU is supported by the Casualty Reduction Section, the Commercial Vehicle Unit and the Serious Collision Investigation Unit. The RPU patrol a 4,500 mile road network, including major roads such as the A12, A120, M11 & M25.

The Safer Essex Roads Partnership (SERP) has brought together the three local authority areas of Essex County Council, Southend-on-Sea Borough Council and Thurrock Council to provide a road safety service across ‘Greater Essex’. The other SERP partners are Essex Police, Essex Fire and Rescue Service, Highways England, The Essex and Herts Air Ambulance Trust, The East of England NHS Trust and The Safer Roads Foundation.

Special Branch
The Special Irish Branch was formed in 1883 by the Metropolitan Police, to deal with Irish Republican activists in London. This extremely secret unit consisted of a handful of detectives whose offices were located in a wooden hut on an island within Green Park, just behind the old Scotland Yard. The unit later took on the role of reporting to the Security Service (MI5) and quickly became recognised as 'The Special Branch'.

Essex Special Branch was formed in 1970 when the Security Service required an input from all provincial police forces.

Special Branch (SB) deals with any matters which may involve any form of subversive activity, such as terrorism, which may affect either life or property nationally or internationally. The air and seaports are specific areas where SB officers operate to ensure that those involved in internal and/or external acts of terrorism are prevented from entering or leaving the country.

SB also maintains close contacts with other police services, both within the UK and abroad, to exchange information on persons who are known or believed to be involved in terrorist activity.

On the domestic front SB combat public disorder by dealing with those involved in extreme activity of any description. Special Branch workload has increased exponentially in the years following the September 11 attacks and 7 July 2005 London bombings. Much of what SB does is highly sensitive, involving national security, and goes unnoticed by the general public.

SB officers are also tasked and trained in armed, close protection duties and work to protect royalty, VIPs and anyone else who could be under threat of attack or assassination, whilst in the Essex Police District.

Serious Crime Division
The Serious Crime Division (SCD) consists of a team of highly experienced detectives who are involved in investigating serious and organised crime inside and outside of the Essex police area. The work of the SCD is centrally coordinated to prioritise crimes and locations that will have most effect on the overall performance of the force. The unit also utilise mobile surveillance teams. Day-to-day business for the SCD includes investigations into serial crimes, such as burglary, car crime and robbery, where criminals cross multiple borders to commit crime.

Economic Crime Unit
The Economic Crime Unit (ECU) is part of SCD and is based at Brentwood. The ECU is made up of detective officers and accredited civilian financial investigators, whose work is overseen by a detective inspector.

The ECU has two distinct but overlapping functions. The first is the investigation of serious and complex fraud. Referrals to the ECU are from other agencies, such as the Department for Business, Serious Fraud Office and Office for the Supervision of Solicitors. The ECU will also take on investigations referred to it by territorial divisions, subject to certain criteria having been met. The unit does not normally accept investigations directly from members of the public.

The second function is the confiscation and/or forfeiture of assets held by persons convicted of drug trafficking offences. With the arrival of the Proceeds of Crime Act 2002 and the government's determination to be more proactive in this area the scope of confiscation and/or forfeiture has increased to include criminal offences of an acquisitive nature.

Hi-Tech Crime Unit
The Hi-Tech Crime Unit deals with computer crime and the use of computers in committing crimes. Offences may include harassment, theft, hacking, phone phreaking (making telephone calls which are then charged to another person's bill) and child pornography.

Many of these are new crimes, which have only appeared since the widespread availability of computers and the Internet. The Hi-Tech Crime Unit is a relatively new addition to policing in Essex and forms part of a national network of agencies fighting against computer crime, headed by the National Hi-Tech Crime Unit based in London Docklands.

Essex Police's Hi-Tech Crime Unit works closely with other network investigators and law enforcement agencies. Although it has been in existence only a short time, the unit has already seen significant results. Part of the work of the unit involves seizing computer-related evidence and using forensic methodology software. Officers have the ability to interrogate the seized computer, even when information has been deleted, and rebuild it to find out what was done and how. The unit also assists police officers in computer-related cases, particularly with conducting interviews or producing technical statements, and produces evidence for court.

The unit is staffed by internationally trained computer specialists, who keep up-to-date with the latest changes in technology and software. They are also able to advise businesses of the danger of computer crime, particularly in e-commerce.

Authorities Bureau
The Authorities Bureau was established to oversee all covert policing authorisations. When Essex Police wish to set up surveillance on a suspect, they must make an application to the Authorities Bureau, who decide whether the surveillance is justified and complies with the Regulation of Investigatory Powers Act 2000 which is based on human rights legislation.

The Bureau oversees all applications from each of the territorial divisions. It is staffed by police officers and support staff. The police officers specialise in the area of surveillance authorities, including the more specialist applications which require authority from the Chief Constable. The support staff are based in the Telephone Enquiry Unit and undertake all enquiries made of the numerous telecom industry members. The staff are trained to a national standard and ensure that the enquiries requested are fully justified, correctly authorised and actioned, according to priorities.

The Bureau are inspected annually by the Office of Surveillance Commissioners, an independent body of serving or recently retired High Court judges who report direct to the Prime Minister.

Vetting Unit
The Vetting Unit is responsible for running checks on individuals who regularly have substantial unsupervised access to children up to the age of 16, or 18 if they have special needs or are looked after by a local authority. The information they gather is disclosed to authorised outside agencies and other police services.

The work of the unit includes the vetting of persons who have applied to become foster parents or adoptive parents, registered childminders and managers of residential care homes and nursing homes.

Force Intelligence Bureau
The role of the Force Intelligence Bureau (FIB) is to assist criminal investigation across the county by bringing together local intelligence from different divisions and out of the police area. The FIB collects information on dangerous sex offenders and those criminals whose activities span more than one area of Essex or across counties. They also analyse trends and links between crimes, so that they can use the right people and the right methods in the right places to prevent crime, this has been discontinued and now has been banned in the area.

Stolen Vehicle Section
The Stolen Vehicle Section of the Force Intelligence Bureau was formed around 1964 to lend assistance and support to police officers in dealing with motor vehicle crime. One of the main functions of the section is the examination and identification of suspect vehicles, plant and other equipment, both by thermal and chemical etching of erased and hidden serial and identification numbers.

After examination, all vehicles identified as stolen by the unit carry a 'Polexam' tamperproof marker. This is placed on a number of locations on the examined vehicle and a marker created on the Police National Computer to indicate that it has been subject of a previous police examination.

The unit were responsible for the implementation of the "decoy vehicle" programme. They are also involved in vehicle crime analysis and attend warrants and briefings where vehicle crime is suspected or known.

Field Intelligence Officers
Area desk Field Intelligence Officers (FIO) are assigned to particular areas of Essex or to liaison with Customs and with other divisions of Essex Police, such as the Drugs and Serious Crime Squad. FIOs are responsible for gathering intelligence on crimes committed in several areas or across area boundaries, so that patterns in these crimes can be analysed.

Criminal Intelligence Analysts
The role of the Criminal Intelligence Analyst is to use all the available information on criminal activity in Essex to assess trends which can be seen now and predict what might happen in the future. The results of this analysis are then passed on to those responsible for making decisions about allocating resources.

Analysts bring together all the information so that they can look for areas where they need more information or focus on particular lines of enquiry.

MOSOVO (Management of Sexual Offenders & Violent Offenders)
The main function of MOSOVO is to assess the threat posed by sex offenders and other potentially dangerous and violent criminals. 'Dangerous offenders' are those people "likely to inflict serious physical or psychological harm on others".

The issue of how to protect the public from dangerous offenders has been vigorously debated since the early 1970s, when a highly publicised homicide case involving a released mental patient led to demands for stronger preventative measures.

MOSOVO work with the Multi-Agency Public Protection Panel (MAPPP), who co-ordinate intelligence and action to reduce the risk posed to the public by potentially dangerous offenders. MAPPP meetings are led by police, probation and social services, with input from other agencies such as housing and criminal justice mental health teams, depending on the case.

The MOSOVO is also responsible for maintaining the Sex Offenders Register, which came into force under the Sex Offenders Act 1997. All convicted sex offenders must register their name and address with police and inform them within 14 days of moving to a new property.

Facial Identification Officer
The trauma that a stranger may inflict during a serious offence may influence the victim's memory of the suspect's identity. This is when the Facial Identification Officer can assist by using a portable computerised feature and paint package programme in order to put together a 'composite' of the offender. Being portable, it enables the officer to travel to the victim's home or their hospital bed. They will interview the witness or victim using 'cognitive' interview which assists the witness to 'relive' rather than 'remember'. Having ascertained a general description of the offender this is then entered into the E-FIT system. The witness then works with the officer to achieve the best 'likeness' of the offender.

Prison Liaison Section
The Prison Liaison Section provides an interface between the police force and the prison service. They give help and advice to both agencies on obtaining information and intelligence with regard to persons in prison custody.

Fleet

Essex Police uses a number of different types of vehicles in its operations:

Response units - patrol and emergency 999 response.
Unmarked units - patrol and emergency 999 response or other duties (e.g. OSG, Roads Policing).
Traffic units - traffic enforcement: Enforce traffic laws and encourage road safety.
Prisoner transport units - transportation of suspects from the scene. 
Public support units - carry public-order trained officers to the scene.
Dog support units - carry police dogs and handlers to the scene.
Non-response units - patrol, however not emergency response. Usually utilised by PCSOs. 
Driver training units - train police drivers to respond on blue lights and sirens.

Police, fire and crime commissioners
The Essex Police, Fire and Crime Commissioners (PFCC) have been:
 2012-2016 : Nick Alston
 2016–present : Roger Hirst

In November 2012, the first PFCC election took place, with a 12.8% turnout, in which Conservative candidate Nick Alston achieved 30.5% of the first round votes, and 51.5% of the second round votes against Independent candidate Mick Thwaites.
 
Alston set his four priorities in his election statement as:
policing that meets local needs
policing that is prompt and professional
effective cooperation and partnership between police, councils and the voluntary sector
to be an influential voice in leading public engagement about crime reduction and policing, and to listen to and speak for the victims of crime.

PEEL inspection
His Majesty's Inspectorate of Constabulary and Fire & Rescue Services (HMICFRS) conducts a periodic police effectiveness, efficiency and legitimacy (PEEL) inspection of each police service's performance. In its latest PEEL inspection, Essex Police was rated as follows:

See also
Law enforcement in the United Kingdom
 List of law enforcement agencies in the United Kingdom, Crown Dependencies and British Overseas Territories

Other emergency services:
East of England Ambulance Service
Essex Air Ambulance
Essex County Fire and Rescue Service

References

Bibliography
 The Essex Police by John Woodgate. Includes black and white plates and an appendix section that gives details of the smaller forces that went to make up Essex Police.

External links 

 
 Essex at HMICFRS

Police forces of England
Organisations based in Essex
1840 establishments in England
Organizations established in 1840